Alfred-Henri-Marie Baudrillart, Orat. (6 January 1859 – 19 May 1942) was a French prelate of the Catholic Church, who became a Cardinal in 1935. An historian and writer, he served as Rector of the Institut Catholique de Paris from 1907 until his death. He campaigned to rouse international support for France during the First World War, while in the Second World War he supported the Vichy regime and backed the Germans for leading the international struggle against bolshevism.

Biography
Baudrillart was born in Paris, to Henri Baudrillart and Marie Sacy. His father was professor of political economy at Collège de France, editor in chief of the Journal des Économistes, and a member of Académie des Sciences Morales et Politiques. Baudrillart's maternal grandfather, Samuel Ustazade de Sacy, was redactor in chief of the Journal des débats and a member of the Académie française.

Raised in the Latin Quarter, Baudrillart entered École Bossuet in 1868, and later the Collège Louis le Grand. In 1876, at the age of seventeen, he decided to pursue a career in the Church. He attended the École Normale Supérieure from 1878 to 1881, where his classmates included Jean Jaures and Henri Bergson. He earned his doctorate with a thesis entitled Philippe V et la Cour de France and earned a theology degree as well. He taught at several schools, including the Collège Stanislas de Paris.

Baudrillart  joined the Oratory of St. Philip of Neri in 1890. He was ordained to the priesthood in Paris on 9 July 1893, at the relatively late age of 34. He then served as professor of history at the Institut Catholique from 1894 to 1907, when he was named its rector; he held this position until his death thirty-five years later. Founding the Revue practique d'apologétique in 1905, he was the director of Bulletin critique from 1898 to 1908, having previously served as a collaborator from 1891 to 1897. Baudrillart served as General Assistant of the Oratorians from 1898 to 1908, and again from 1919 to 1921.

He was a "ferocious opponent" (farouche adversaire) of "modernism", a complex of ideas and social developments that the Catholic Church identified broadly as historicism, secularism, and rationalism, and which Baudrillart identified with the bishops of Germany and their resistance to the teaching of Pope Pius X in his encyclical denouncing modernism, Pascendi dominici gregis (1907).

Baudrillart was an ardent supporter of France in the First World War and promoted its cause internationally. He founded the Comite catholique de propagande francaise a l'etranger and reached an audience of 15 million with articles written for publication in U.S. newspapers. He also gave lectures in Spain and the U.S. In May 1917, he rejected an overture from Matthias Erzberger of the German Catholic Centre Party because he thought it wrong for Catholics or any other group to act in the place of the lawful government.

Baudrillart was made an honorary canon of the metropolitan cathedral chapter of Paris in 1906, and a Domestic prelate of His Holiness on 17 April 1907. On 10 October 1908, he became Vicar General of Paris.

He was elected as a member of the Académie française, like his grandfather, on 2 May 1918.

On 29 July 1921, Baudrillart was appointed Titular Bishop of Hemeria by Pope Benedict XV. He received his episcopal consecration on the following 28 October in the Institut's Église des Carmes from Cardinal Louis-Ernest Dubois, with Bishops Stanislas Touchet and Joseph-Marie Tissier serving as co-consecrators. Baudrillart was later advanced to Titular Archbishop of Melitene on 12 April 1928.

On a visit to a francophone conference in Canada in 1927, he imagined in his diaries the future on an independent French state in North America. During his visit to New York on that trip, The New York Times called him "one of the best known bishops in the world".

Pope Pius XI created him Cardinal Priest of S. Bernardo alle Terme in the consistory of 16 December 1935. Baudrillart was one of the cardinal electors in the 1939 papal conclave, which elected Pope Pius XII. Pius was close friends with General Maurice Gamelin, whom Baudrillart had once taught.

Baudrillart supported the Vichy government of Marshal Philippe Pétain, issuing a statement titled Choisir, vouloir, obéir (Choose, desire, obey) on 20 November 1940, which shocked his colleagues and veterans of the First World War. In August 1941, as a fervent anti-communist, endorsed the formation of the creation of a Legion of French Volunteers Against Bolshevism to fight alongside the Germans. His endorsement of the Legion said:

Baudrillart died in Paris on 19 May 1942 at the age of 83. He was interred in the Église des Carmes at the Institut Catholique.

Writings
History
 Madame de Maintenon (1882) 
 Présentations de Philippe V à la Couronne de France (1887)
 Rapport sur une mission en Espagne aux archives d'Alcale de Henares et de Simancas (1889)
 Philippe V et la Cour de France, 5 vol. (1889-1901) 
 De cardinalis Quirini vita et operibus (1889)
 Comment et pourquoi la France est restée catholique au XVIe siècle? (1895) 
 Les Normaliens dans l'Église (1895)
 La France chrétienne dans l'histoire (1896)
 Le renouvellement intellectuel du clergé de France au XIXe siècle (1903)
 L'Église catholique, la Renaissance, le Protestantisme (1904)
 Lettres du duc de Bourgogne au roi d'Espagne Philippe V et à la reine, 2 vol. (1912)
 Benoît XV (1920)
 La Très Vénérable Camille de Soyecourt ou Celle qui n'a pas eu peur (1941)

Other non-fiction
 Quatre cents ans de concordat (1905)
 Les universités catholiques de France et de l'étranger (1909)
 L'enseignement catholique dans la France contemporaine (1910)
 La vie de Mgr d'Hulst (1912), founder of the Institut catholique 
 Frédéric Ozanam (1912), a founder of the Society of Saint Vincent de Paul
 Soldats et étudiants catholiques (1914)
 La guerre allemande et le catholicisme (1915)
 Une campagne française (1917)
 L'Allemagne et les Alliés devant la conscience chrétienne (1917)
 L'effort canadien (1917)
 Lettres d'un pèlerin français au Levant et en Terre Sainte (1924)
 L'activité missionnaire de l'Église à travers les âges (1927)
 Mœurs païennes, mœurs chrétiennes (1930)
 L'Institut catholique (1930)
 La vocation de la France (1934)
 La voix du chef (1941)

Memoirs
 Vingt-cinq ans de rectorat. L'Institut catholique de Paris, 1907-1932 (1932)
 Paul Christophe, editor, Les carnets du cardinal Baudrillart, 9 volumes (Paris: Editions du Cerf), 1994–1999,

References

Additional sources
Paul Christophe, "Le cardinal Baudrillart et ses choix pendant la Seconde Guerre mondiale", Revue d'histoire de l'Église de France,   1992, v. 200,  pp. 57–75

External links
 Cardinals of the Holy Roman Church
 Catholic-Hierarchy 

1859 births
1942 deaths
Clergy from Paris
Institut Catholique de Paris alumni
20th-century French cardinals
Members of the Académie Française
École Normale Supérieure alumni
French collaborators with Nazi Germany
Catholicism and far-right politics
Christian fascists
Legion of French Volunteers Against Bolshevism